The 25th Annual Grammy Awards were held on February 23, 1983, at Shrine Auditorium, Los Angeles. They recognized accomplishments by musicians from the previous year.

Album of the Year went to Toto for Toto IV, and Song of the Year went to Johnny Christopher, Mark James and Wayne Carson for "Always on My Mind".

Awards

General
Record of the Year
 "Rosanna" – Toto
 Toto, producer 

Album of the Year
 Toto IV – Toto
 Toto, producer

Song of the Year
 "Always on My Mind"
 Johnny Christopher, Mark James & Wayne Carson, songwriters (Willie Nelson)

Best New Artist
 Men at Work
 Asia
 Jennifer Holliday
 The Human League
 Stray Cats

Blues
Best Traditional Blues Recording
Clarence "Gatemouth" Brown for Alright Again

Children's
Best Recording for Children
David Levine & Lucy Simon (producers) for In Harmony 2 performed by various artists

Classical
Best Orchestral Performance
Jay David Saks, Thomas Z. Shepard (producers), James Levine (conductor)  & the Chicago Symphony Orchestra for Mahler: Sym. No. 7 in E Min. (Song of the Night)
Best Classical Vocal Soloist Performance
Zubin Mehta (conductor), Leontyne Price & the Israel Philharmonic Orchestra for Verdi: Arias (Leontyne Price Sings Verdi)
Best Opera Recording
Andrew Kazdin (producer), Pierre Boulez (conductor), Jeannine Altmeyer, Hermann Becht, Peter Hofmann, Siegfried Jerusalem, Gwyneth Jones, Manfred Jung, Donald McIntyre, Matti Salminen, Ortrun Wenkel, Heinz Zednik & the Bayreuth Festival Orchestra for Wagner: Der Ring des Nibelungen
Best Choral Performance (other than opera)
Georg Solti (conductor), Margaret Hillis (choir director) & the Chicago Symphony Orchestra & Chorus for Berlioz: La Damnation de Faust
Best Classical Performance, Instrumental Soloist (with orchestra)
Daniel Barenboim (conductor), Itzhak Perlman & the Chicago Symphony Orchestra for Elgar: Violin Concerto in B Minor
Best Classical Performance, Instrumental Soloist (without orchestra)
Glenn Gould for Bach: The Goldberg Variations
Best Chamber Music Performance
Richard Goode & Richard Stoltzman for Brahms: The Sonatas for Clarinet & Piano, Op. 120 
Best Classical Album
Samuel H. Carter (producer) & Glenn Gould for Bach: The Goldberg Variations

Comedy
Best Comedy Recording
Richard Pryor for Live on the Sunset Strip

Composing and arranging
Best Instrumental Composition
John Williams (composer) for "Flying - Theme From "E.T. the Extra-Terrestrial"
Best Album of Original Score Written for a Motion Picture or Television Special
John Williams (composer) for E.T. the Extra-Terrestrial
Best Arrangement on an Instrumental Recording
John Williams (arranger) for "Flying - Theme From "E.T. the Extra-Terrestrial"
Best Instrumental Arrangement Accompanying Vocal(s)
Jerry Hey & David Paich, Jeff Porcaro (arrangers) for "Rosanna" performed by Toto
Best Vocal Arrangement for Two or More Voices
David Paich (arranger) for "Rosanna" performed by Toto

Country
Best Country Vocal Performance, Female
Juice Newton for "Break It to Me Gently"
Best Country Vocal Performance, Male
Willie Nelson for  "Always on My Mind"
Best Country Performance by a Duo or Group with Vocal
Alabama for Mountain Music
Best Country Instrumental Performance
Roy Clark for "Alabama Jubilee"
Best Country Song
Wayne Carson, Johnny Christopher & Mark James (songwriters) for "Always on My Mind" performed by Willie Nelson

Folk
Best Ethnic or Traditional Folk Recording
Queen Ida for Queen Ida & the Bon Temps Zydeco Band on Tour

Gospel
Best Gospel Performance, Traditional 
Blackwood Brothers for I'm Following You 
Best Gospel Performance, Contemporary 
Amy Grant for Age to Age
Best Soul Gospel Performance, Traditional
Al Green for Precious Lord
Best Soul Gospel Performance, Contemporary
Al Green for Higher Plane
Best Inspirational Performance
Barbara Mandrell for He Set My Life to Music

Historical
Best Historical Album
Alan Dell, Ethel Gabriel & Don Wardell (producers) for The Tommy Dorsey/Frank Sinatra Sessions - Vols.1,2 & 3

Jazz
Best Jazz Vocal Performance, Female
Sarah Vaughan for Gershwin Live!
Best Jazz Vocal Performance, Male
Mel Tormé for An Evening with George Shearing & Mel Tormé
Best Jazz Vocal Performance, Duo or Group
The Manhattan Transfer for "Route 66"
Best Jazz Instrumental Performance, Soloist
Miles Davis for We Want Miles
Best Instrumental Jazz Performance, Group
Phil Woods for "More" Live
Best Jazz Instrumental Performance, Big Band
Count Basie for Warm Breeze
Best Jazz Fusion Performance, Vocal or Instrumental
Pat Metheny Group for Offramp

Latin
Best Latin Recording
Machito for Machito & His Salsa Big Band '82

Musical show
Best Cast Show Album
Henry Krieger (composer), Tom Eyen (lyricist), David Foster (producer) & various artists for Dreamgirls

Music video
Best Video of the Year
Olivia Newton-John for Physical

Packaging and notes
Best Album Package
John Kosh & Ron Larson (art directors) for Get Closer performed by Linda Ronstadt
Best Album Notes
John Chilton & Richard M. Sudhalter (notes writers) for Bunny Berigan - Giants Of Jazz performed by Bunny Berigan

Pop
Best Pop Vocal Performance, Female
Melissa Manchester for "You Should Hear How She Talks About You"
Best Pop Vocal Performance, Male
Lionel Richie for "Truly"
Best Pop Performance by a Duo or Group with Vocal
Joe Cocker & Jennifer Warnes for "Up Where We Belong"
Best Pop Instrumental Performance
Ernie Watts for "Chariots of Fire Theme (Dance Version)"

Production and engineering
Best Engineered Recording, Non-Classical
Al Schmitt, David Leonard, Greg Ladanyi & Tom Knox (engineers) for Toto IV performed by Toto
Best Classical Engineered Recording
Paul Goodman (engineer), James Levine (conductor) & the Chicago Symphony Orchestra for Mahler: Symphony No. 7 in E Minor (Song of the Night)
Producer of the Year
Toto
Classical Producer of the Year
Robert Woods

R&B
Best R&B Vocal Performance, Female
Jennifer Holliday for "And I Am Telling You (I'm Not Going)"
Best R&B Vocal Performance, Male
Marvin Gaye for "Sexual Healing"
Best R&B Performance by a Duo or Group with Vocal
Dazz Band for "Let It Whip"
Earth, Wind & Fire for "Wanna Be with You" 
Best R&B Instrumental Performance
Marvin Gaye for "Sexual Healing (Instrumental Version)"
Best Rhythm & Blues Song
Bill Champlin, Jay Graydon & Steve Lukather (songwriters) for "Turn Your Love Around" performed by George Benson

Rock
Best Rock Vocal Performance, Female 
Pat Benatar for "Shadows of the Night"
Best Rock Vocal Performance, Male
John Cougar Mellencamp for "Hurts So Good"
Best Rock Performance by a Duo or Group with Vocal
Survivor for "Eye of the Tiger"
Best Rock Instrumental Performance
A Flock of Seagulls for "D.N.A."

Spoken
Best Spoken Word, Documentary or Drama Recording
Tom Voegeli (producer) for Raiders of the Lost Ark - The Movie on Record performed by various artists

References

Further reading

External links
25th Grammy Awards at the Internet Movie Database

 025
1983 in California
1983 music awards
1983 in Los Angeles
1983 in American music
Grammy
February 1983 events in the United States